The Siberut flying squirrel (Petinomys lugens) is a species of rodent in the family Sciuridae. It is endemic to Indonesia.  Its natural habitat is subtropical or tropical dry forests. It is threatened by habitat loss.

References

Thorington, R. W. Jr. and R. S. Hoffman. 2005. Family Sciuridae. pp. 754–818 in Mammal Species of the World a Taxonomic and Geographic Reference. D. E. Wilson and D. M. Reeder eds. Johns Hopkins University Press, Baltimore.

Mammals of Indonesia
Petinomys
Mammals described in 1895
Taxa named by Oldfield Thomas
Taxonomy articles created by Polbot